Frederick William Tod (1879 - 1958) was an English born Australian furniture maker and woodcarver.

Work held in collections 

 Honour roll designs in the Sydney Living Museums 
Archive of design drawings by F.W. Tod held at Caroline Chisholm

References 

1879 births
1958 deaths
Australian furniture makers
Australian woodcarvers
British emigrants to Australia